Cercococcyx is a genus of cuckoos in the family Cuculidae, known as the long-tailed cuckoos.
It contains the following species:

Whistling long-tailed cuckoo (Cercococcyx lemaireae)
Barred long-tailed cuckoo (Cercococcyx montanus)
 Dusky long-tailed cuckoo (Cercococcyx mechowi)
 Olive long-tailed cuckoo (Cercococcyx olivinus)

 
Cuculidae
Bird genera
 
Taxonomy articles created by Polbot